Thomas Preston (1893 – 1971) was a Scottish footballer who played as a right half for Airdrieonians, spending his entire career with the club. He was a member of the Diamonds team that won the Scottish Cup in 1924. Preston was selected once for the Scottish Football League XI in the same year as the cup win, and took part in a trial match for the full Scotland team in 1925.

His younger brother Bob was also a footballer who played for Heart of Midlothian, Torquay United and Plymouth Argyle.

References

1893 births
1971 deaths
Association football wing halves
People from Loanhead
Sportspeople from Midlothian
Scottish Junior Football Association players
Scotland junior international footballers
Scottish Football League players
Scottish footballers
Airdrieonians F.C. (1878) players
Scottish Football League representative players